Results and election information for past Minnesota governor races. The first election was in 1857 ahead of Minnesota becoming a state. Elections were set for every two years beginning in 1859. In 1886 elections were moved from odd years to even years. In 1962 the governor's term increased to 4 years.

1857 Minnesota gubernatorial election
1859 Minnesota gubernatorial election
1861 Minnesota gubernatorial election
1863 Minnesota gubernatorial election
1865 Minnesota gubernatorial election
1867 Minnesota gubernatorial election
1869 Minnesota gubernatorial election
1871 Minnesota gubernatorial election
1873 Minnesota gubernatorial election
1875 Minnesota gubernatorial election
1877 Minnesota gubernatorial election
1879 Minnesota gubernatorial election
1881 Minnesota gubernatorial election
1883 Minnesota gubernatorial election
1886 Minnesota gubernatorial election
1888 Minnesota gubernatorial election
1890 Minnesota gubernatorial election
1892 Minnesota gubernatorial election
1894 Minnesota gubernatorial election
1896 Minnesota gubernatorial election
1898 Minnesota gubernatorial election
1900 Minnesota gubernatorial election
1902 Minnesota gubernatorial election
1904 Minnesota gubernatorial election
1906 Minnesota gubernatorial election
1908 Minnesota gubernatorial election
1910 Minnesota gubernatorial election
1912 Minnesota gubernatorial election
1914 Minnesota gubernatorial election
1916 Minnesota gubernatorial election
1918 Minnesota gubernatorial election
1920 Minnesota gubernatorial election
1922 Minnesota gubernatorial election
1924 Minnesota gubernatorial election
1926 Minnesota gubernatorial election
1928 Minnesota gubernatorial election
1930 Minnesota gubernatorial election
1932 Minnesota gubernatorial election
1934 Minnesota gubernatorial election
1936 Minnesota gubernatorial election
1938 Minnesota gubernatorial election
1940 Minnesota gubernatorial election
1942 Minnesota gubernatorial election
1944 Minnesota gubernatorial election
1946 Minnesota gubernatorial election
1948 Minnesota gubernatorial election
1950 Minnesota gubernatorial election
1952 Minnesota gubernatorial election
1954 Minnesota gubernatorial election
1956 Minnesota gubernatorial election
1958 Minnesota gubernatorial election
1960 Minnesota gubernatorial election
1962 Minnesota gubernatorial election
1966 Minnesota gubernatorial election
1970 Minnesota gubernatorial election
1974 Minnesota gubernatorial election
1978 Minnesota gubernatorial election
1982 Minnesota gubernatorial election
1986 Minnesota gubernatorial election
1990 Minnesota gubernatorial election
1994 Minnesota gubernatorial election
1998 Minnesota gubernatorial election
2002 Minnesota gubernatorial election
2006 Minnesota gubernatorial election
2010 Minnesota gubernatorial election
2014 Minnesota gubernatorial election
2018 Minnesota gubernatorial election
2022 Minnesota gubernatorial election
pdf file of election results

 
Gubernatorial elections
Minnesota gubernatorial
Elections